FC Start Chuhuiv, is a football team based in Chuhuiv, Ukraine.

History
The club appeared sometime in 1954 and in the short period of time became the most titled football team in Kharkiv Oblast winning its regional championship 9 times. Later the record was superseded only by two other clubs both from Kupyansk, Metalurh and Lokomotyv. In 1960s Start Chuhuiv was among the most successful teams in Ukraine that did not carry the status of a "team of masters" when the team won Ukrainian and Soviet cup competitions among KFK teams.

By 1980 the teams has disappeared, but was revived once again in 2011.

Honors
Soviet Cup for collective teams of physical culture
 Holders (1): 1961
 Finalists (1): 1960

Ukrainian Cup for collective teams of physical culture
 Holders: (2): 1960, 1961

Kharkiv Oblast football championship
 Winners (9): 1956, 1957, 1958, 1959, 1960, 1961, 1962, 1963, 1965
 Runners-up (1): 1964

Kharkiv Oblast Cup
 Holders (1): 1969

Coaches
 1952–1962 Oleksandr Butenko
 1974–1974 Leonid Ostrovsky
 2011–2012 Oleksandr Lushpenko

References

Chuhuiv
Football clubs in Kharkiv Oblast
Amateur football clubs in Ukraine